Stall Hill Island is a small forested inland island on Lake Rico within Massasoit State Park in Taunton, Massachusetts, United States.

References

Lake islands of Massachusetts
Islands of Bristol County, Massachusetts
Coastal islands of Massachusetts